Polača is a village and a municipality in Croatia in Zadar County.

According to the 2011 census, there are 1,468 inhabitants, in the following settlements:
 Donja Jagodnja, population 113
 Gornja Jagodnja, population 85
 Kakma, population 213
 Polača, population 1,057

88% of the population are Croats.

References

Municipalities of Croatia
Populated places in Zadar County